Brazil competed in the 2019 Pan American Games in Lima, Peru from July 26 to August 11, 2019.

On July 25, 2019, it was announced that, for the first time in the history of the Pan American Games, a nation would have two flag bearers during the opening ceremony. The indicated were Brazilian 49er FX class sailors Martine Grael and Kahena Kunze.

In 2019, Brazil pulled off its best performance in history, winning 54 gold and 169 overall medals, and finishing second in the standings for the first time since they hosted the competition in 1963.

Competitors
The following is the list of number of competitors (per gender) participating at the games per sport/discipline.

Medalists
The following competitors from Brazil won medals at the games. In the by discipline sections below, medalists' names are bolded.

Archery

Brazil qualified a full team of eight athletes (four men and four women).

Men

Women

Mixed

Artistic swimming

Brazil has qualified a full team of nine athletes.

Athletics

Men
Track & road events

Field events

Combined events – Decathlon

Women
Track & road events

Field events

Combined events – Heptathlon

Badminton

Brazil qualified a full team of eight athletes (four men and four women).
Men

Women

Mixed

Basketball

5x5
Summary

Women's tournament

Preliminary round

Semifinal

Gold medal game

3x3
Summary

Men's tournament

Preliminary round

Semifinal

Bronze medal game

Women's tournament

Preliminary round

Semifinal

Bronze medal game

Basque pelota

Brazil qualified one athlete to the basque pelota competition.

Men

Bodybuilding

Brazil qualified a full team of two bodybuilders (one male and one female).

No results were provided for the prejudging round, with only the top six advancing.

Bowling

Brazil qualified a full team of four athletes (two men and two women).

Boxing

Brazil qualified eight boxers (five men and three women).

Men

Women

Canoeing

Slalom
Brazil qualified a total of six slalom athletes (three men and three women).

Sprint
Brazil qualified a total of 10 sprint athletes (six men and four women).

Men

Women

Cycling

Brazil has qualified 16 athletes: 10 men and 6 women. The team was officially announced on June 4, 2019.

BMX

Freestyle

Racing

Mountain

Road
Men

Track
Men

Sprint

Keirin

Women

Madison

Omnium

Diving

Brazil qualified a full team of eight divers (four men and four women).

Men

Women

Equestrian

Brazil qualified a full team of 12 equestrians (four per discipline).

Dressage

Eventing

Jumping

Fencing

Brazil qualified 15 fencers (9 men, 6 women). The team was officially announced on June 5, 2019.

Men

Women

Golf

Brazil qualified a full team of four golfers (two men and two women). The team was officially announced on June 4, 2019.

Gymnastics

Artistic
Brazil qualified a team of ten gymnasts in artistic (five men and five women).

Men
Team & Individual Qualification

Qualification Legend: Q = Qualified to apparatus final

Individual finals

Women
Team & Individual Qualification

Qualification Legend: Q = Qualified to apparatus final

Individual finals

Rhythmic
Brazil qualified two individual gymnasts and five gymnasts for the group event in rhythmic (seven women).
Individual

Group

Trampoline
Brazil qualified three gymnasts in trampoline (one man and two women).

Handball

Brazil qualified a men's team (of 14 athletes) by winning the 2018 South American Games.

Brazil qualified a women's team (of 14 athletes) by winning the 2018 South American Games.

Summary

Men's tournament

Semifinal

Bronze medal match

Women's tournament

Semifinal

Final

Judo

Brazil has qualified a full team of fourteen judokas (seven men and seven women). The team was officially announced on May 27, 2019.

Men

Women

Karate

Brazil qualified a team of 15 karatekas (seven men and eight women).

Kumite (sparring)

Kata (forms)

Modern pentathlon

Brazil qualified five modern pentathletes (two men and three women).

Roller sports

Figure
Brazil qualified a team of two athletes in figure skating (one man and one woman).

Speed
Brazil qualified one male athlete in speed skating.

Rowing

Brazil qualified 14 boats, for a total of 20 rowers, at the 2018 Pan American Qualification Regatta.

Men

Women

Rugby sevens

Brazil qualified a women's team (of 12 athletes) by winning the Women's competition at the 2018 South American Games.

Brazil qualified a men's team (of 12 athletes) after being finalist at the 2019 Sudamérica Rugby Sevens Olympic Qualifying Tournament.

Summary

Men's tournament

Semifinal

Bronze medal match

Women's tournament

Pool stage

Semifinal

Bronze medal match

Sailing

Brazil has qualified 11 boats for a total of 17 sailors.

Men

Women

Mixed

Open

Shooting

Brazil qualified a team of 21 shooters (twelve men and nine women).

Men
Pistol and rifle

Shotgun

Women
Pistol and rifle

Shotgun

Mixed

Squash

Brazil qualified a male team of 3 athletes through the 2018 Pan American Squash Championships.

Men

Surfing

Brazil qualified eight surfers (four men and four women) in the sport's debut at the Pan American Games.

Artistic

Race

Swimming

Brazil has qualified 35 athletes total, 18 men and 17 women:

Men

Women

Mixed

Table tennis

Brazil qualified a full team of six athletes (three men and three women). The team was officially announced on June 10, 2019.

Men

Women

Mixed

Taekwondo

Brazil has qualified a full team of eight athletes (four men and four women) at Kyorugi events. The team was officially announced on June 4, 2019.

Kyorugi

Men

Women

Tennis

Brazil has qualified a full team of six athletes (three men and three women). After the withdrawal of Marcelo Demoliner and Beatriz Haddad Maia, the nation competed with two athletes of each gender.

Men

Women

Mixed

Triathlon

Brazil qualified a full triathlon team of six athletes (three men and three women). The team was officially named on June 2, 2019.

Mixed relay

Volleyball

Beach

Brazil has qualified a men's and women's pair for a total of four athletes.

Indoor

Brazil qualified a men's team (of 12 athletes) by finishing in the top five at the 2018 Men's Pan-American Volleyball Cup.

Brazil qualified a women's team (of 12 athletes) by finishing in the top five at the 2018 Women's Pan-American Volleyball Cup.

Summary

Men's tournament

Group stage

Semifinal

Bronze medal match

Women's tournament

Group stage

Semifinal

Bronze medal match

Water polo

Brazil qualified a men's team (of 11 athletes) by winning the 2018 South American Swimming Championships.

Brazil qualified a women's team (of 11 athletes) by winning the 2018 South American Swimming Championships.

Summary

Men's tournament

Preliminary round

Quarterfinal

Semifinal

Bronze medal match

Women's tournament

Water skiing

Brazil qualified two water skiers (one of each gender) and two wakeboarders (one of each gender).

Men

Women

Weightlifting

Brazil qualified five weightlifters (three men and two women). The team was officially announced on May 29, 2019.

Wrestling

Brazil qualified nine wrestlers (four men and five women).

Men

Women

See also
Brazil at the 2019 Parapan American Games
Brazil at the 2020 Summer Olympics

References

Nations at the 2019 Pan American Games
2019
2019 in Brazilian sport